George A. Huff, Jr. (June 11, 1872 – October 1, 1936) was an American football and baseball player, coach, and college athletics administrator.  Huff served as the head football coach at the University of Illinois at Urbana–Champaign from 1895 to 1899, compiling a record of 21–16–3.  He was also the head baseball coach at Illinois from 1896 to 1919, tallying a mark of 317–97–4, and the athletic director at Illinois from 1901 to 1935.  Huff Hall at the University of Illinois in Champaign is named in his honor.

Huff was briefly a manager for the Boston Americans at the start of the 1907 Major League Baseball season following the sudden suicide of Chick Stahl.  Cy Young started out as the player/manager, but after six games stepped down in favor of Huff.  Huff managed only eight games, finishing with a career 2–6 managerial record, before resigning on May 1, 1907 to return to his old job.  Bob Unglaub replaced him.  The Americans had a total of four managers in the 1907 season.  The team was renamed as the Boston Red Sox the following season.

Head coaching record

Football

Managerial record

References

External links
 

1872 births
1936 deaths
19th-century players of American football
19th-century baseball players
American football guards
Boston Red Sox managers
Dartmouth Big Green baseball players
Dartmouth Big Green football players
Galesburg (minor league baseball) players
Geisel School of Medicine alumni
Illinois Fighting Illini athletic directors
Illinois Fighting Illini baseball coaches
Illinois Fighting Illini baseball players
Illinois Fighting Illini football coaches
Illinois Fighting Illini football players
Sportspeople from Champaign, Illinois
Coaches of American football from Illinois
Players of American football from Illinois
Baseball players from Illinois